The Co Founder is an American emo band based out of the Pacific Northwest, located in the upper Northwest corner of the United States.

Career
Formed in 2015, the band's current lineup consists of Hayden Eller (vocals, guitar), Luke Hogfoss (Guitar, vocals) and Jake Barrow (drums, percussion). Described by New Noise Magazine as "combin[ing] the anthemic arrangements of Manchester Orchestra, with lo-fi washed soundscapes reminiscent of The Radio Dept". the band's "infectious personality, coupled with relentless hooks and grueling tour schedule, has earned them one of the most loyal followings in DIY music." "Gaining a reputation for their relentless touring scheduling, the group has drawn comparisons to dynamic-pop acts such as Manchester Orchestra, Restorations, and Pinegrove.”

The band's debut album (Wye) was premiered on September 8, 2016 by Do206. Eller has been quoted describing the recording process behind 'Wye', stating "I just wanted to focus on writing really simple pop songs for this album, so when I was writing the initial demos I tried to strip as much away as I could. I wanted to see what the result would be if we stuck to an ideal that each song needed to be similar to that Nirvana approach of ‘nursery rhymes on steroids. I have a soft spot for really big, anthemic, music, so (to me) Wye is an interesting juxtaposition between this stripped down three piece playing really simple songs that have pretty big choruses.”. In the same interview, Hogfoss added "It was almost like watching a puzzle grow as we added in a piece here and a bassline there - Jake and I were able to bring in additions to sort of 'self-actualize' the already great music that Hayden had written.” 

A follow-up vinyl 7", entitled "phd", was premiered on February 8, 2017 by New Noise Magazine - containing two new tracks ("Obsessed", "Balance"), New Noise praised the release as "a marked step forward, both in terms of songwriting and production quality." "phd" (an acronym for "perfectly hidden depression") has been hailed by Impose Magazine as "a share-worthy production, almost certain to attract both the melodic pop-seekers of everyday life and the obscurity-lovers who naturally find their way to incredible music like this first. 5/5."

In a November 2017 interview with Electric Daze Magazine Van Wyck was quoted saying that the songs on gymnasium are "more dynamic, less folk and a lot more emphasis on bass and rhythm." Eller has gone on to explain that "the majority of it ["gymnasium"] last May, with Luke, over two or three weeks and have been steadily chipping away at the production process since then."

"Full Stop", the debut single off "gymnasium" was released via The Grey Estates. The Grey Estates praised the release as "endearing borderline alt-country moments are overpowered by the grandiose sounds of reverb fueled power chords that fill the room. Over it all sit simplistic, poetic-esq lyrics that are just melodramatic enough to fit the mood". Seattle Music Insider lauded the tracks dynamic volume shifts and emotional performances, stating "as the track crescendos one final time, each instrument remains controlled; this, as it seems, is one of the strongest tools in The Co Founder’s toolbox, in that they have an impeccable ability to remain together and tight, no matter how loud or soft they wish to be." A music video for Full Stop was released shortly after the single's initial premiere - hosted by Atwood Magazine, the video depicts an 8bit dinosaur attempting to maneuver the difficulties of "DIY Tour Runner", a fictitious arcade game created by the band in an effort to illustrate the lyrical content of Full Stop. In March 2018 the band made their first appearance at Austin, TX's South by Southwest Music Festival, performing at South by Hikes Fest on March 14.

In early April 2018 the band announced plans for their first Full US tour, to be followed by their first string of international tour dates - a 10-day tour of Japan.

"Quarter Mile", the third and final single from "gymnasium" was released July 12 via New Noise Magazine - speaking to the lyrical content, Eller is quoted as saying "Lyrically, ‘Quarter Mile’ centers around my struggles with depression/suicidal ideation. Mental health has been an ongoing battle for me since I was 15–16, and the song is meant to speak to that back and forth – feeling okay one day, and stuck in a hole on the next."

The band completed their first full US tour in October 2018, consisting of 35 shows in 40 days, spanning over 27 states.

In December 2018 the band announced their full Japan tour schedule, consisting of 10 shows across the Tokyo metropolitan area, along with their intent to record a 4 song EP in Ellijay (GA) in March 2019. While the band originally intended to record four songs, Solid Silver Hits was released on December 4th, 2020 as a two track single. All proceeds from the release are being donated to Fair Fight, a voting rights organization based out of Atlanta, Georgia.

On August 16, 2022 The Co Founder announced their reformation via Instagram.

Band members
Current
 Hayden Eller – vocals, guitar (2015–present)

Past
 Nikko Van Wyck – bass guitar (2017– 2019)
 Jake Barrow – drums, percussion, vocals (2016–2019)
 Luke Hogfoss – guitar, bass guitar, vocals (September 2016-August 2017 // August 2018-2019)

Music videos
Sink/Swim
  Released December 14th, 2018
  Concept/Directed - The Co Founder
  Production/Editing - Hayden Eller
  From "gymnasium" (August 2, 2018)

Already Know
  Premiered via Pfluff on June 14, 2018
  Concept/Directed/Edited by Hayden Eller
  Featuring animation from Pokémon Red Version "Pokemon Red Version"
  From "gymnasium" (August 2, 2018)

Full Stop
  Premiered via Atwood Magazine on February 1, 2018
  Concept by Hayden Eller
  Directed/Edited by Hayden Eller
  Production by Hayden Eller and Jake Barrow
  Featuring 8bit Dinosaur from Google Chrome's "Dino Run"
  From "gymnasium" (August 2, 2018)

Balance and Composure
  Premiered via Do206 on April 15, 2016
  Directed by Directed by Tyler Michael James
  Director of Photography: Ian Hussey
  Second Unit Director of Photography: Kevyn Delgado
  Featuring Olivia Lowe and Phillip McElroy 
  From "Whiskey & 45's"
  Credits taken from original Vimeo posting

Discography

Studio albums
 gymnasium (August 6th, 2018)

 Wye (September 8, 2016)

Hayden Eller — Production
Tye Hastings (Tye Hastings Audio) — Engineering, Mixing
Chris Hanzsek (Hanzsek Audio) — Mastering
Erik Wallace (Shibusa Sound) — Additional Mixing Assistance 
Paige Heinen (@gazerlies) — Artwork (Front Cover)
Hayden Eller — Layout, design

EPs
 Old Programs/New Beliefs (July 2015)
 Whiskey & 45's (November 2015)

Singles
 "phd" (February 9, 2017)

Hayden Eller, Luke Hogfoss, Jake Barrow (The Co Founder) — Production
Erik Wallace (Shibusa Sound) — Engineering/Mixing
Chris Hanzsek (Hanzsek Audio) — Mastering
Mimi Jaffe (@dr.jaffe) — Artwork

Podcast appearances
The Dan Cable Presents Podcast
  December 30, 2016  (Full interview with Eller, Hogfoss, and Barrow)
  November 10, 2017  (Full interview with Eller, Van Wyck, and Barrow)

Live performance videos
Brunch Tunes (Acoustic)
  Location: Oakland, CA (Released July 22nd, 2018)
  Videographer - Ira Cooper Torey
  Audio - Colin Frost
  All tracks taken from "gymnasium" // All tracks written by The Co Founder
  Credits taken from original YouTube posting

The Western Sessions (Acoustic)
  Location: Western Washington University (Bellingham, WA) (Released September 10, 2016)
  Videographer - Jared Rusk
  Audio - Tye Hastings
  All tracks taken from "Wye" // All tracks written by The Co Founder
  Credits taken from original YouTube posting

The Golden Gate Sessions (Acoustic)
  Premiered on December 5, 2016 via New Noise Magazine 
  Location: San Francisco, California (Golden Gate Bridge Overlook)
  Audio - Luke Hogfoss
  Videography - Lindsey Shern
  Audio/Video Editing - Hayden Eller
  Performances by - Hayden Eller (Guitar/Vocals) and Jake Barrow (Ukulele/Vocals)
  All tracks taken from "Wye" // All tracks written by The Co Founder 
  Credits taken from original YouTube posting

References

Musical groups from Washington (state)
Musical groups established in 2015
2015 establishments in the United States